Baba Mohan Rama (Devanagari: बाबा मोहन राम) is a Hindu folk deity. He is considered by his adherents to be an avatar of the deity Krishna, who appeared during the Dvapara Yuga.

Iconography 
His iconography varies regionally, but he is said to have a gold ring around his head, with a peacock feather holding his dreadlocks, with face resembling Krishna with a glaze of a moon, and a garland made up of pearl and a rudraksha. He rides on a blue horse, who is believed to be the incarnation of Shesha. He is typically shown dressed as a Brahmin, and wearing wooden slippers. He is also featured upon a throne that he acquired from Brahmaloka.

Nomenclature 
Baba Mohan Rama's name is derived from the epithets of Shiva, Krishna, and Rama respectively, as he is considered to be a form of the Trimurti. He is attributed as the creator, sustainer, and the destroyer of the universe by his devotees. He is said to have miraculous powers, and his tapasya is meant for the upliftment of people, and providing them a direction to reach liberation (moksha) by being their teacher (guru) in the Kali Yuga. He is supposed to be a descendant of Brahmin pujaris.

Veneration 
Baba Mohan Rama's Cave is in the mountain of Kali Kholi, in Bhiwadi, where his  (eternal fire) is present. According to legend, the temple is surrounded by miracles and divine energy, and any service that people do there benefits them, like sweeping the temple floor, donating food to poor, providing water to the bird feeders, and feeding animals, especially cows. The temple is surrounded by trees and birds of various species. It is said that the deity commanded his devotees to build a temple in his name in the village of Milakpur, where his first devotee, Nandu Ji, lived.

References 

Folk deities of Rajasthan
Hindu folk deities